The 2002 Stroud Council election took place on 2 May 2002 to elect members of Stroud District Council in Gloucestershire, England. The whole council was up for election with boundary changes since the last election in 2000 reducing the number of seats by 4. The Conservative Party gained overall control of the council from no overall control.

Election result
Before the election the Conservatives were the largest party on the council with 24 seats, 4 seats short of having a majority. The results saw the Conservatives gain control of the council after Labour lost seats. Overall turnout in the election was 39.83%.

Ward results

References

2002 English local elections
2002
2000s in Gloucestershire